Ojo Encino is an unincorporated community and census-designated place (CDP) in McKinley County, New Mexico, United States, on the Navajo Nation. It was first listed as a CDP prior to the 2020 census.

It is on the west side of the valley of Encino Wash, a southeast-running tributary of Torreon Wash, Arroyo Chico, and eventually Rio Puerco, a tributary of the Rio Grande.

Demographics

References 

Census-designated places in McKinley County, New Mexico
Census-designated places in New Mexico
Navajo Nation